Utopia is an American film production, distribution and sales agency founded in 2018, by Robert Schwartzman and Cole Harper. The company is best known for releasing films Mickey and the Bear (2019), Bloody Nose, Empty Pockets (2020), Shiva Baby (2021), Vortex (2021), We're All Going to the World's Fair (2022), and Sharp Stick (2022).

Production
In February 2019, it was announced Robert Schwartzman and Cole Harper had launched Utopia, a film production, distribution, and sales company. The company's first releases were Fiddlin directed by Julie Simone, American Dharma directed by Errol Morris, and Mickey and the Bear directed by Annabelle Attanasio, in November 2019. The company also handled international sales on Sword of Trust directed by Lynn Shelton.

In September 2020, the company launched Altavod providing distributors and filmmakers full control to distribute their film projects, with 91% of sales going directly to the filmmakers. In November 2020, Utopia launched Utopia Originals which would additionally handle the sales of television projects.

Filmography

2010s

2020s

Upcoming

References

External links
 

Film distributors of the United States
Film production companies of the United States
Mass media companies established in 2019
American independent film studios